No Wedding Bells is a 1923 American silent short comedy film featuring Oliver Hardy.

Cast
 Larry Semon as Larry
 Lucille Carlisle as The Girl
 Oliver Hardy as The Girl's Father (credited as Babe Hardy)
 Spencer Bell as The Butler
 Glen Cavender as An Irate Husband
 Kathleen Myers as Bit Role (uncredited)

See also
 List of American films of 1923
 Oliver Hardy filmography

References

External links

1923 films
1923 short films
American silent short films
American black-and-white films
Films directed by Larry Semon
1923 comedy films
Silent American comedy films
American comedy short films
Vitagraph Studios short films
1920s American films